GMA Network, Inc., commonly known as GMA, is a Philippine media company based in Diliman, Quezon City, Philippines. It is primarily involved in radio and television broadcasting, with subsidiaries dealing in various media related businesses. The majority of its profits are derived from publicity and marketing incomes associated to television distribution. GMA is the largest media company in the Philippines in terms of market capitalization, net income, revenue, reach, audience share and number of stations.

Founded on June 14, 1950, it currently owns and operates two national television networks (GMA Network and GTV), four digital terrestrial television channels (Heart of Asia, Hallypop, Pinoy Hits and I Heart Movies), two national radio stations (Super Radyo DZBB 594 kHz and Barangay LS 97.1), two regional radio networks (Super Radyo and Barangay FM), and one regional tv network,  It also operates three international channels (GMA Pinoy TV, GMA Life TV and GMA News TV International), along with subsidiaries dealing in film production and distribution (GMA Pictures), music production and publishing (GMA Music) and (GMA Playlist), talent development and management (Sparkle GMA Artist Center), digital terrestrial television providers (GMA Affordabox and GMA Now) and a number of Internet and digital converging technology (GMA New Media) in the Philippines. The company is a publicly traded company on the Philippine Stock Exchange.

History
The company's roots can be traced back to then Loreto F. de Hemedes, Inc., owned by Robert "Uncle Bob" Stewart, an American war correspondent. The company started with the launching of its first AM radio station in Manila through Radio Broadcasting Station, DZBB. It went on air on March 1, 1950, using the frequency of 580 kHz of the AM band, broadcasting from the Calvo Building in Escolta, Manila. Its early radio coverage highlights were the crash of President Ramon Magsaysay's plane in Mount Manunggal; the eruption of Mount Hibok-Hibok and various local elections in the Philippines. DZBB became the first radio station in the Philippines to use telephones for live interviews.

Within years since its first broadcasts, the huge triumph of the station and its growing number of listeners made clear the move to modern facilities in EDSA, Quezon City, with the work done in 1959.

On October 29, 1961, the company launched its first television station, RBS TV Channel 7 using local VHF channel 7. In 1963, DYSS Television was launched in Cebu. From Loreto F. de Hemedes, Inc., the firm was renamed Republic Broadcasting System, Inc. in 1974, when a triumvirate composed of Gilberto Duavit Sr., Menardo Jimenez and Felipe Gozon took over the corporation.

In 1987, GMA became the first Philippine network to broadcast in StereoVision while opening their high-end live studio at Broadway Centrum.  In 1988, the network greatly improved its signal by switching to its 777-ft transmitter known as the Tower of Power. In 1992, the Philippine Congress passed a law granting the network to operate for another 25 years. The network launched the Rainbow Satellite, making their programs available nationwide and across Southeast Asia. In 1996, the company changed its corporate identity to GMA Network Inc.

On April 21, 2017, Philippine President Rodrigo Duterte signed Republic Act No. 10925 which renewed GMA Network's license for another 25 years. The law granted GMA Network Inc. a franchise to construct, install, operate, and maintain, for commercial purposes, radio broadcasting stations and television stations, including digital television system, with the corresponding facilities such as relay stations, throughout the Philippines.

Television

GMA Network

GMA Network, commonly known as GMA, is a major Philippine commercial television network. Launched on October 29, 1961, GMA Network is also referred to as the “Kapuso Network” in reference to the company's logo. Its headquarters can be found at the GMA Network Center in Quezon City.

GTV

GTV is a Philippine general entertainment channel that aired on its flagship station, UHF channel 27 and was launched on February 22, 2021, replacing GMA News TV. The channel carries news, entertainment and sports programs and it is available in most satellite and cable TV systems.

Heart of Asia

Heart of Asia is a Filipino digital television channel owned by GMA Network. The channel was initially launched on June 12, 2020, and officially launched on June 29, 2020.

Hallypop

Hallypop is an Asian pop culture digital channel and the Philippine version of its U.S.-based counterpart with branding under licensed from Jungo TV, after both parties signed a joint venture in 2019. The channel was initially launched on September 6, 2020, and was officially launched on September 20, 2020.

I Heart Movies

I Heart Movies is a movie television channel owned by GMA Network. The channel was initially launched on March 25, 2021, and officially launched on April 5, 2021.

Pinoy Hits
Pinoy Hits is a Filipino digital television channel owned by GMA Network. The channel was initially launched on January 2, 2023, and officially launched on January 16, 2023.

International broadcasts

GMA Pinoy TV

In March 2005, GMA Network launched its first international channel, GMA Pinoy TV. The channel is targeted toward Filipino communities worldwide. Flagship programs from GMA Network are shown aside from in-house programming. It also syndicates shows. GMA Pinoy TV is available in key cities in the United States, Canada, Middle East, Australia, New Zealand and some parts of Asia and Europe.

GMA Life TV

In February 2008, GMA International launched its second international channel via GMA Life TV. It carries programming from GMA Network and from its former lifestyle channel in the Philippines, Q. It also carries new programs broadcast by the news channel, GMA News TV. GMA Life TV is available through satellite and cable TV system worldwide.

GMA News TV International

GMA International announced the launch of GMA News TV International in July 2011. It will be available through satellite and cable TV systems worldwide. It will be the third international channel of GMA Network Inc., together with GMA Pinoy TV and GMA Life TV. GMA News TV International is current available on a preview channel basis in Australia via UBI World TV and FetchTV, IPS/AccessTV in Japan and GUdTV in Guam.

Radio

DZBB

DZBB, also known as Super Radyo DZBB 594 is the AM radio station of RGMA in Metropolitan Manila, one of GMA Network's subsidiaries. Radio studios are located at GMA Network Center in Quezon City while its radio transmitter is at Obando, Bulacan. The station operates 24 hours a day except every Monday midnight. Some of the programs of GMA and GTV's Dobol B TV block are simultaneously simulcast on the station.

DWLS

DWLS-FM, also known as Barangay LS 97.1, is the FM radio station of RGMA in Metropolitan Manila, a subsidiary of GMA Network. Its main radio studios are located at the GMA Network Center in Quezon City and its transmitter is at Tandang Sora Avenue, Quezon City. DWLS is the assigned call letters for the radio station and it was derived from the name of Loreto Stewart, the wife of its founder, Robert La Rue "Uncle Bob" Stewart.

Broadcast facilities

Tower of Power

In order to strengthen its broadcast signal in Metropolitan Manila and its suburbs, GMA Network Inc. constructed the Tower of Power in the third quarter of 1987.

GMA Network, Inc. spent more than PhP168 million to the upgrade its broadcast transmitters and facilities in various key cities in the Philippines. It plans to augment its existing studio facilities in Cebu, Iloilo and Davao. It also plans to upgrade construction of its existing broadcast facilities in Dagupan to further improve its coverage in the northern part of the Philippines. These upgrades include new transmitting equipment, from transmitters to antenna systems and buildings/tower rehabilitation/construction. GMA Network Inc. expects completion of these projects by end 2009.

Presented to the Philippine Stock Exchange on January 15, 2009, GMA Network, Inc. discloses that it already disbursed almost PhP1.3 billion from the proceeds of its initial public offering to support various expansion programs in key cities in the Philippines. Expansion includes construction of broadcast facility, tower and transmitter upgrade for its Naga station; broadcast facility and transmitter tower for its Legazpi station; construction of transmitter tower and upgrading its General Santos station; and upgrading broadcast facilities, equipment and transmitter tower in Davao, Cebu, Guimaras, Bacolod, Iloilo, Batangas, Dagupan, Cagayan de Oro and Benguet.

GMA Network Center

GMA Network, Inc. inaugurated its state-of-the-art GMA Network Center on June 14, 2000, as part of the year-round celebration to commemorate its 50th anniversary. GMA Network Center supports GMA Network, Inc.'s thrusts towards digitization and media convergence. While the first phase of the project has already been completed with the construction of the 17-storey corporate complex, the center has an option to upgrade the older, existing facilities in the GMA compound, as originally planned. The network center is equipped with MARC (Multiple Automated Recorder Cassette) and a Broadcast Automation System that allows the network to manage live and international feeds that will be carried out to GMA Pinoy TV subscribers around the world.

GMA Network Studios
The GMA Network Studios consist of seven studios. Studio 1 and Studio 4 houses the programs of GMA News TV such as the cooking show Idol sa Kusina and the primetime talk show Tonight with Arnold Clavio. Studio 1 and Studio 4 (formerly known as Studio A and Studio B, respectively) was the first two old studios of GMA Network which is located in the old compound (formerly known as the RBS compound). Studio 2, 3, and 5 are located in GMA Network Center building. Studio23 houses the GMA News TV newscasts such as Balitanghali, Good News Kasama si Vicky Morales, and News TV Live. Studio 3 houses the morning news and talk show Unang Hirit, while GMA Network flagship news programs 24 Oras, Saksi, GMA News Update, the investigative docudrama show Imbestigador and the GMA News TV flagship news program State of the Nation with Jessica Soho airs live from Studio 5. The German Moreno Studio (formerly Studio 6) and Studio 7, the largest studios of GMA Network, are located in the GMA Network Studio Annex. The German Moreno Studio has an area of 640 square meters and can accommodate 300 to 400 audiences. It houses the comedy sketch gag show Bubble Gang, the afternoon game-variety show Wowowin, the cooking and talk show Sarap, 'Di Ba? and the infotainment show IBilib. Studio 7 has an area of 1,020 square meters and can accommodate 600 to 800 audiences.

GMA Network, Inc. takes a significant step in the continuous strengthening and improvement of the network's news department with a P154 million (2.9m USD) investment on a Newsroom Automation System (NAS). A signing of agreement between GMA Network and Vizrt was held on March 14, 2018, at the GMA Network Center in Quezon City.

Digital television
The National Telecommunications Commission (NTC) ordered all broadcasting companies in the Philippines to shut off their analog signal by 11:59 p.m. on December 31, 2015, and switch to digital broadcast. The Philippines will be using the Japanese ISDB-T to facilitate the country's transition to digital television, rather than the ATSC system implemented by North American broadcasters devised as a replacement for the NTSC system utilized by North America and the Philippines.

GMA Network is presently applying for a digital television license from the NTC to install and maintain transmitting stations that will be attuned with and utilize to offer digital terrestrial television and digital mobile TV broadcast services, using channel 27 (551.143 MHz) frequency. Areas planned for a temporary digital broadcast will cover the cities of Quezon City, Makati, Pasig, Tagaytay, and Angeles City in Pampanga; and areas like Ortigas, Cavite, and Calumpit in Bulacan.

GMA Network, Inc. asked the NTC to reconsider its decision to use the Japanese standard and examine the European digital broadcast system instead. In earlier decisions, the National Telecommunications Commission reaffirmed its resolutions to use ISDB-T and conduct public consultations for its implementing rules and regulations which will be ready by April 2011. On March 27, 2011, the local regulator ordered an evaluation of the standard to be used by the Philippines for digital television and reconsidering the second-generation Digital Video Broadcasting (DVB2) from Europe and replacing the Japanese Integrated Services Digital Broadcasting (ISDB) standard.

In February 2013, GMA Network, Inc. was able to conduct digital test broadcast with the ISDB-T standard via its UHF channel 27's frequency. GMA Network was the first television network in the Philippines to broadcast GMA 7 and GMA News TV 11 in standard definition (SD) format with a 4:3 aspect ratio, similar to TV channels in European countries, although the content had been stretched horizontally from its original 4:3 ratio. GMA 7 was also transmitting 1seg on mobile and had no errors. However, in a statement, the network has not conceded its stand to prefer the European DVB-T2 over the Japanese ISDB-T.

Online

GMA News Online

Established in January 2007, GMA News Online (formerly GMANews.TV) is the official site of GMA News. It features the latest news coverage, including video reports, as well as business, sports, technology, entertainment and special reports, mobile alerts, newsletters, RSS feeds and real time search. A diverse number of presenters and correspondents maintain blogs on its site and has an archiving database for its news content. A live stream of DZBB, an AM radio station of GMA Network is also available on its website. It also features YouScoop, an interactive section, wherein viewers can upload first-hand footage of news events happening in their area and visitors can also view such footage. Aside from GMA News and Public Affairs content and materials produced, GMA News Online publishes articles and features from several news organizations, including The Associated Press and Reuters wire service. In December 2010, GMANews.TV received one million page views per day.

On February 7, 2011, GMANews.TV was renamed to GMA News Online and launched a new logo and slogan, “The Go-to Site For Filipinos Everywhere”; and retain its uniform resource locator, www.gmanews.tv to correspond with the launching of its all-news channel, GMA News TV.

myGMA Internet TV
On September 12, 2008, GMA Network, Inc. launched its first video-on-demand service through myGMA Internet TV. Focusing on Filipino communities, it offers high-quality programs from GMA Network. It is an alternative to Filipino communities who does not have the access of cable TV and direct-to-home subscriptions. myGMA Internet TV competed with ABS-CBN’s TFC.tv. Currently, myGMA Internet TV is inactive.

Joint ventures

INQ7.net
GMA Network Inc. partnered with the Philippine Daily Inquirer, one of Philippines' daily broadsheets to venture in an online multimedia news and information delivery company, INQ7 Interactive Inc. Its main business offers text, images, audio, video and online interactive information tools such as discussion boards, polls and searchable news archives. The partnership also paved the way the creation of a joint web site, the www.inq7.net and in recent reports, its ranks no. 11 in the most read online newspaper worldwide. In January 2007, GMA Network, Inc. and Philippine Daily Inquirer ended their partnership and GMA Network Inc. focused on to its owned consent site, the GMA News Online (formerly known as GMANews.TV).

Philippine Entertainment Portal (PEP)
Philippine Entertainment Portal, Inc., a joint venture between GMA New Media, Inc. and Summit Media, operates Philippine Entertainment Portal (PEP) and Sports Interactive Network (SPIN).

Kapuso JobMarket
Partnerships of GMA Network Inc., the Philippine Daily Inquirer, INQ7 Interactive Inc. and New Media Inc. The Kapuso JobMarket aims to provide convenience for job seekers by creating another online service that will help them search for employment opportunities using their mobile phones.

Q
Q was a partnership between GMA Network, Inc. and ZOE Broadcasting Network Inc. The television channel previously aired foreign dramas, lifestyle shows and public affairs programming. The channel ceased commercial operation on February 20, 2011, to give way to its sister channel, GMA News TV.

Defunct channels

GMA News TV
GMA News TV was a Philippine news and lifestyle-oriented channel that was launched on February 28, 2011, and was aired on local UHF channel 27 and formerly VHF channel 11 through its blocktime agreement with ZOE until June 2019. On February 21, 2021, GMA News TV stopped its broadcast operations to give way for GTV the following day. It was generally watched as a free-to-air news and lifestyle-oriented channel in the Philippines.

Q (Quality Television)
In November 2005, GMA Network, Inc. entered an airtime agreement with ZOE Broadcasting Network to use DZOE-TV channel 11 for its local lifestyle channel Q (formerly QTV, Quality Television). Most of Q's programming consists of foreign dramas, reality and lifestyle shows. On February 20, 2011, Q ceased commercial operation to give way to GMA News TV.

Channel [V] Philippines
On December 15, 1999, STAR TV Network leased the airtime of Citynet to launch Channel [V] Philippines through EMC (Entertainment Music Channel). Part of the strategy is to localize Channel V with programs produced locally by STAR TV Network and GMA Network Inc.

EMC (Entertainment Music Channel)
In 1999, Entertainment Music Channel or EMC is the first music channel of GMA Network Inc. after its UHF station, Citynet Television was rebranded due to high programming cost and stiff competition from free-to-air UHF TV channels. The music channel only lasted months after GMA Network Inc. signed a leased broadcast agreement with STAR TV Network to transmit a localize music television station, Channel [V] Philippines.

Citynet Television
On August 27, 1995, GMA Network, Inc. inaugurate its first ultra-high-frequency channel through DWDB-TV channel 27 in Metropolitan Manila. It was the first UHF television channel operated by a major broadcast network in the Philippines. GMA Network Inc. launches its new channel under the Citynet Television brand and decided to expand its local programming business. Studios are located at the GMA Network Center in Quezon City. In April 1999, Citynet Television ceased its commercial operation and later on reformatted into a local music channel.

CGMA
In the 1990s, GMA Network, Inc. ventures into cable television via CGMA, a cable channel available on Home Cable. It broadcast defunct and previously aired shows on GMA Network. Eventually, CGMA ceased its commercial operation when Home Cable entered into a memorandum of agreement to consolidate the operation of its company with Lopez-owned Sky Cable, an ABS-CBN Corporation subsidiary, GMA Network Inc.'s main competitor.

GMA didn't have its own cable channel until 2005 with the launch of GMA Pinoy TV, but unlike CGMA, GMA Pinoy TV (and its sister channels) only caters to international audiences.

Fox Filipino

Fox Filipino was an archive entertainment cable television channel launched on March 1, 2012. It featured Filipino-produced programming from GMA Network and Filipino movies from GMA Pictures, entries from the Cinemalaya Philippine Independent Film Festival, selected Asian and Hollywood movies, and selected foreign programming dubbed in Filipino language. After 8 years of broadcasting, Fox Networks Group announced that Fox Filipino would cease broadcast on July 7, 2020, as GMA and TV5 archived content were moved to GMA's digital television channel, Heart of Asia and Cignal-run satellite channel, One Screen, respectively.

Executive management

Atty. Felipe L. Gozon (chairman of the board, chief executive officer)
Gilberto Duavit Jr. (president, chief operating officer, director)
Felipe S. Yalong (chief financial officer, SVP for Corporate Services Group, corporate treasurer, director)
Lilybeth G. Rasonable (senior vice president for Entertainment Group)
Oliver Victor B. Amoroso (Acting Head of GMA Integrated News and first vice president and Head of GMA Regional TV and Synergy)
Nessa S. Valdellon (first vice president for Public Affairs)
Miguel Castro Enriquez (Consultant for Radio Operation Group and President of RGMA Network)
Ayahl Ari Augusto P. Chio (vice president for investor relations and compliance)
Eduardo P. Santos (compliance officer)
Roberto O. Parel (corporate secretary)
Atty. Anna Teresa “Annette” M. Gozon-Valdes (Senior Vice President)

Assets

Divisions 
GMA Entertainment Group
GMA Integrated News and Public Affairs
GMA Integrated News and Public Affairs Digital
GMA Integrated News Research
GMA News Online
YouScoop
IMReady
GMA Regional TV
52 GMA Network stations
27 GTV stations
8 digital terrestrial television stations
GMA International
GMA Pinoy TV
GMA Life TV
GMA News TV
GMA On Demand
Sparkle GMA Artist Center
Synergy: A GMA Collaboration

Subsidiaries 
GMA New Media, Inc.
Digify, Inc.
MediaMerge Corporation
GMA News Online
GMA Network Portal
Philippine Entertainment Portal, Inc. (50%)
PEP.ph
SPIN.PH (Sports Interactive Network Philippines)
GMA Affordabox
GMA Now
GMA Network Films, Inc.
GMA Pictures
Backyard Productions
RGMA Marketing and Productions, Inc. (GMA Music)
GMA Playlist
AltG Records
Spotlight Music Sessions
Citynet Network Marketing and Productions, Inc.
Script2010, Inc. 
DWDB-TV
GMA Worldwide (Philippines), Inc.
Alta Productions Group, Inc.
GMA Ventures, Inc.

Affiliates 
RGMA Network, Inc. (49%)
Super Radyo DZBB 594khz
Barangay LS 97.1
Super Radyo Nationwide
Barangay FM
Mont-Aire Realty and Development Corp. (49%)

Corporate social responsibility 
GMA Kapuso Foundation
Kapwa Ko Mahal Ko Foundation

References

External links

Media Ownership Monitor Philippines - Media Companies: A Duopoly Rules by VERA Files and Reporters Without Borders

 
Companies listed on the Philippine Stock Exchange
2007 initial public offerings
Mass media companies of the Philippines
Broadcasting companies of the Philippines
Entertainment companies of the Philippines
Philippine radio networks
Mass media in Metro Manila
Peabody Award winners
Television channels and stations established in 1961
Companies based in Quezon City
Philippine companies established in 1950